Ernest Chénière (born 26 April 1945 in Rivière-Salée, Martinique) is a French politician who represented the department of Oise in the French National Assembly from 1993 to 1997.

References

1945 births
Living people
People from Rivière-Salée
Black French politicians
Martiniquais politicians
Rally for the Republic politicians
Deputies of the 10th National Assembly of the French Fifth Republic